Kishunpur is a town and a nagar panchayat in Fatehpur district and in Khaga Sub-district in the Indian state of Uttar Pradesh.

Demographics
As of 2011 India census, Kishunpur had a population of 7,000 out of which 3,671 are males and 3,329 are females thus the Average Sex Ratio of Kishunpur is 907. Kishunpur has an average literacy rate of 65.60% thus Kishunpur has lower literacy rate compared to 67.4% of Fatehpur district. The male literacy rate is 75.19% and the female literacy rate is 54.9% in Kishunpur.

See also
 Kishunpur, a village in Jaunpur, India

References

Cities and towns in Fatehpur district